There have been two baronetcies created for a person with the surname Bridgeman, both in the Baronetage of England.

 Bridgeman baronets of Great Lever (1660): see Earl of Bradford.
 Bridgeman baronets of Ridley (1673)

Set index articles on titles of nobility